Cayley is a small lunar impact crater that is located in a lava-flooded region to the west of Mare Tranquillitatis. It was named after the 19th century British mathematician Arthur Cayley. It lies to the northwest of the smaller crater De Morgan and the larger D'Arrest. West and slightly north of Cayley is Whewell, a crater of about the same dimensions. To the north is a linear rille designated Rima Ariadaeus, which follows a course to the east-southeast.

Description
This is a circular, bowl-shaped formation with a small interior floor at the midpoint. (Small being relative to the overall diameter, as it occupies about one-fourth the total cross-section.) The sloping interior walls are relatively light in hue, having a higher albedo as the surrounding terrain. However it is not nearly as bright as the slightly larger crater Dionysius to the east-southeast, and lacks a ray system.

The smooth, rolling plains to the east of this crater are called the Cayley Formation. It is somewhat similar to the lunar maria, but has a slightly higher albedo and is overlapped at the eastern edge by the Mare Tranquillitatis. Lunar scientists suspect that this plain may have resulted from deposits of ejecta from the formation of large impact basins such as Mare Imbrium or Mare Orientale. (The most likely source is the Mare Imbrium impact basin to the northwest.)

References

 — see Fig. 46

External links

Cayley at The Moon Wiki   (now defunct)
  - includes a couple of craters such as Cayley

Impact craters on the Moon